Solute carrier organic anion transporter family member 4A1 is a protein that in humans is encoded by the SLCO4A1 gene.

See also
 Solute carrier family

References

Further reading

Solute carrier family